Major-General Forbes MacBean  (1857–1919) was a British Army officer.

Military career
Born the son of Colonel Forbes MacBean and educated at Uppingham School, MacBean was commissioned into the Gordon Highlanders in 1876. After taking part in the Second Anglo-Afghan War in 1879, he was mentioned in dispatches for his actions in taking the heights of Dargai in 1897 during the Tirah campaign.

MacBean also served in the Second Boer War in 1899. John Stirling recorded in his book 'Our Regiments in South Africa 1899–1902' that The Gordons were led by Lieut.-Colonel Burney and by Colonel Forbes Macbean, who has perhaps seen more hard fighting than any officer now alive and with his regiment.

He went on to be General Officer Commanding Highland Division in April 1908 and commander of the 21st Bareilly Brigade in India in September 1911 before retiring in January 1915.

He was Aide-de-camp to the King Edward VII from 1907 to 1911.

References

1857 births
1919 deaths
Companions of the Order of the Bath
Commanders of the Royal Victorian Order
Gordon Highlanders officers
People educated at Uppingham School
British military personnel of the Tirah campaign
British military personnel of the Second Anglo-Afghan War
British Army personnel of the Second Boer War
British Army generals of World War I
British Army major generals